rRNA N-glycosylase (ribosomal ribonucleate N-glycosidase, nigrin b, RNA N-glycosidase, rRNA N-glycosidase, ricin, momorcochin-S, Mirabilis antiviral protein, gelonin, saporins) is an enzyme with systematic name rRNA N-glycohydrolase. This enzyme catalyses the following chemical reaction

 Hydrolysis of the N-glycosylic bond at A-4324 in 28S rRNA from eukaryotic ribosomes.

Ricin A-chain and related toxins show this activity. The only protein family known to have this activity is the ribosome-inactivating protein (RIP) family.

References

External links 
 

EC 3.2.2